Leskoec is a village in the municipality of Ohrid, North Macedonia.

Demographics
According to the 2002 census, the village had a total of 2,595 inhabitants. Ethnic groups in the village include:

Macedonians 2,561
Serbs 8
Aromanians 3
Others 23

References

External links
www.ohrid.com.mk

Villages in Ohrid Municipality